Övre Svartlå (or simply Svartlå) is a locality situated in Boden Municipality, Norrbotten County, Sweden with 201 inhabitants in 2010.

References 

Populated places in Boden Municipality
Norrbotten